Phan Trần (Vietnamese: Phan Trần truyện, chữ Hán: 潘陳傳) is an anonymous Vietnamese language epic poem in lục bát verse originally written in Nôm script. It was first transcribed into the Latin-based modern Vietnamese alphabet in 1889.

There was a saying that "Men should not talk about the story of Phan Trần, women should not talk about The Tale of Kiều," because the plot of Phan Trần concerns romantic emotions of a man, Phan Sinh, who falls in love with Diệu Thường, a girl from the Trần family even though his parents have arranged another marriage.

References

Vietnamese poems